David Stewart (13 December 1869 – 3 August 1933) was a Scottish footballer who played as a defender or half back.

Career
Born in Glasgow, Stewart played club football for Queen's Park, winning the Scottish Cup in 1893  by beating Celtic and also featuring on the losing side in the 1892 and 1900 finals against the same opposition. He made two appearances for Scotland.

He later moved to London where he played for Caledonians. His younger brother Andy was also a footballer whose clubs included Queen's Park.

Notes

References

1869 births
1933 deaths
Scottish footballers
Footballers from Glasgow
People from Gorbals
Scotland international footballers
Queen's Park F.C. players
Association football defenders
Association football wing halves
London Caledonians F.C. players